Melvin Barrera Chávez (born 5 August 1976 in San Salvador, El Salvador) is a retired Salvadoran football goalkeeper.

He is now working in Maryland.

Club career
Nicknamed Scorpion, Barrera learned his trade in the USA as son of Salvadoran immigrants. He went to play in El Salvador for Águila, one of the big boys in Salvadoran football.

International career
Barrera made his debut for El Salvador in an April 1997 UNCAF Nations Cup match against Honduras and has earned a total of 4 caps, all of them at the 1997 UNCAF Nations Cup.

References

External links

1976 births
Living people
Association football goalkeepers
Salvadoran footballers
El Salvador international footballers
C.D. Águila footballers
Salvadoran expatriate footballers